Heath McCormick (born August 7, 1976) is a Canadian-American curler from Sarnia, Ontario.

Career
McCormick began curling in 1992 as a junior in Ontario. He competed in the Ontario Junior Curling Championships five times, and won in 1996 playing third for Patrick Ferris. That rink represented Ontario at the 1996 Canadian Junior Curling Championships where they lost in a tie-breaker game to Nova Scotia's Rob Sifton. He also competed in the Ontario's men's provincial championships six times and finished as runner-up in 2003. He was part of the winning team in the 2004 Ontario mixed championship. He lost in the final of the 2004 Canadian Mixed Curling Championship to Shannon Kleibrink of Alberta.

In 2010, McCormick returned to the United States after he was recruited by Bill Stopera, Martin Sather, and Dean Gemmell to replace Matt Hames, who was retiring, as skip. With his new team, McCormick competed in the 2011 United States Men's Curling Championship, finishing fourth after a playoff loss to Todd Birr. He returned the next year to play in the nationals and went through the round robin undefeated, eventually securing his first nationals title with a win over defending champion Pete Fenson.

McCormick and his team played at the 2013 United States Men's Curling Championship, and qualified for the playoffs, defeating Fenson and Mike Farbelow in the tiebreaker round. They lost to eventual champion Brady Clark in the 3 vs. 4 page playoff game.

Upon their semifinal win at the 2012 United States Men's Curling Championship, McCormick and his team were qualified to participate at the 2014 United States Olympic Curling Trials.

Grand Slam record

Personal life
McCormick grew up in Sarnia, Ontario. He studied at the University of Western Ontario. He works as an insurance broker with McCormick Insurance Brokers Ltd. Despite sharing a last name, Heath is not related to United States female curler Debbie McCormick.

Teams

References

External links
 

1976 births
Living people
American male curlers
Canadian male curlers
Curlers from Ontario
Sportspeople from Lansing, Michigan
Sportspeople from Sarnia
Continental Cup of Curling participants
American curling champions
American emigrants to Canada